Calliapagurops charcoti is a species of mud shrimp from Macaronesia. It is the only mud shrimp known from Madeira, and is the only species of mud shrimp thought to be a filter feeder.

Description
Its body is white, sometimes with bands of reddish brown. The flagella of the antennae bear long setae (hairs). The animal spreads these like a fan, from the entrance to its burrow, and probably uses them for filter feeding. No other mud shrimp is known to be a filter feeder in this way.

History and distribution
This is one of the largest depth ranges of any mud shrimp. The only other species in the genus, C. foresti, was described from the Philippines in 2002.

References

Thalassinidea
Crustaceans of the Atlantic Ocean
Arthropods of the Azores
Crustaceans described in 1973